Ingjaldr Helgason was a Hiberno-Norse chieftain of the 9th Century.

According to the Landnámabók Ingjald was the son of Helgi, the son of Olaf, the son of Gudrod, the son of Halfdan Hvitbeinn; he was thus distantly related to the Yngling kings of Vestfold and later Norway. According to Eyrbyggja saga, Ingjald's mother was Thora, a daughter of Sigurd Snake-in-the-Eye, who was a son of Ragnar Lodbrok. However, this connection is dubious, as Ingjald appears to have been born in the early 9th Century – either before or at around the same time as Ragnar.

Ingjald had at least one son, Olaf the White, who became King of Dublin.

Notes

References
Forte, Angelo, Richard Oram and Frederik Pedersen. Viking Empires. Cambridge: Cambridge University Press, 2005 .

Norse-Gaels